The Filipino boy band SB19 has performed seven concerts (including one international),  six virtual concerts, eleven music festivals, three fanmeeting tours and one upcoming concert tours, kick-off on September 17, 2022.

On December 28, 2019, SB19 hold its 1st major concert at Cuneta Astrodome were the tickets sold out in 3 minutes.

In August 2021, SB19 "Back in the Zone" virtual concert was a huge hit. It was sold 8,000 concert tickets on the first day with accumulated more than 12,000 tickets sold. It set the record as the highest-selling concert on the virtual concert platform with more than 14,000 unique viewers—also making it one of the most successful online concerts in the Philippines. On October 17, SB19 and 4th Impact displayed a moving show in the benefit event billed "FORTE: A Pop Orchestra Concert". It is a virtual concert, a combination of classical music and new generation pop sound through the efforts of Battig Chamber Orchestra and Sr. Baptista Battig Music Foundation.

SB19 decided to start off 2022 on the right foot with a show-stopping performance at the ASEAN-Korea "Round Festival", representing the Philippines. SB19 was included in the lineup for the 2021 ASEAN-Korea Round Festival held on January 9. It is an international music festival from Korea with the goal of sharing cultures within the ASEAN region.

On March 16, 2022, SB19 had their first performance in Dubai at the Expo 2020. Gulf News, a Dubai-based publication, reported that tickets were almost sold out in less than 24 hours after the concert was announced. On August 8, Acer Day 2022 ambassador SB19 performed to a huge crowd at the SM Mall of Asia Arena. The event was a huge success, trended locally and worldwide on Twitter and has over 2.4 million views on TikTok. On August 12, SB19 announce new single and Manila concert on September and also teased a regional tour, including a stop in Singapore. Following the concert, SB19 will embark upon a tour of the Philippines, which will see them perform in Clark, Cebu, Davao. After wrapping up the Philippines tour, they will embark upon a world tour beginning in October that will take the P-pop act to Singapore, the United States, the United Arab Emirates. On August 21, tickets for SB19's Where You At Tour concert at the Araneta Coliseum have been sold out in less than 24 hours. The first in the history of Pinoy pop music. The US "Where You At Tour" kick-off on November 5 at the Palladium Times Square in New York City.

Tours

Concert

Local

International

Virtual concerts

Music festivals

Fanmeeting tours

References 

Live performances
Lists of concert tours
Lists of events in the Philippines